The Socialist Unionist Party ( Al-Wahdawiyyun Al-Ishtirakiyyun) is a leftist Nasserist political party in Syria. The party was founded in 1962 through a split in the Ba'ath Party. It is part of the National Progressive Front of legally permitted parties that support socialism and Arab nationalism. The party leader is Fayiz Ismail. Abdullah Sallum Abdullah, a member of this party, ran for president in 2021 Syrian presidential election.

Presidential elections

Parliamentary elections

References

External links
 Party website

1962 establishments in Syria
Arab nationalism in Syria
Nasserist political parties
Political parties established in 1962
Political parties in Syria
Socialist parties in Syria